This is a combined list of the Spur, Parallel, Metropolitan Area Ring and City Ring routes of National Trunk Highway System Expressways of China. Auxiliary expressways are followed by two additional digits of their primary expressway and the GXX0X series routes are city beltways. Generally, odd-numbered routes have lower numbers in the east and higher numbers in the west; even-numbered routes have lower numbers in the north and higher numbers in the south.

Before 2017, those codes were followed by a cardinal point (N, S, E, W) and an additional digit if repeated starting with 2; associated auxiliary expressways were followed by two additional digits, but during the 13th National People's Congress in 2017, the SAC published a new recommendation national standard GB/T 917-2017, in this standard document, all auxiliary routes are ruled only having two additional digits, and therefore all parallel routes and most of city ring routes are having their codes changed.

China contains large groups of areas that are sparsely populated; expressways in these areas are therefore usually not designated principals, except when connecting provincial capitals with Beijing (G6, G7) or part of the Eurasian Land Bridge (G30, also the more practical route for Xinjiang to connect with Central and Southern China). However, in plans for 2035 all prefecture-level capitals and an absolute majority of counties must connect to the NTHS network, even in those remote areas, resulting in extremely long branch expressways (spur routes) of the NTHS, including but not limited to G0611, G0612, G0613, G0615, G1013, G1816, G5511. They likely will exceed 1,000 (2,000 for G0612 and G0613) km when completed, while the longest branch Interstate does not exceed 250 km. The G4218 is estimated at 4,000 km and will be the longest spur route in the world when completed.

In this list under Number column, the gray colored routes are not yet completed. The routes are officially printed in the 2022 National Highway Network Plan.

Spur Expressways

Parallel Expressways

Metropolitan Area Ring Expressways 

All are added in 2022 plan.

City Ring Expressways 
In 2022, some ring expressways of coastal cities were removed due to geographical constraints, along with Lhasa's, due to its extremely rugged and mountainous terrain, and Shenzhen's, probably due to EIA problems regarding Hong Kong Frontier Closed Areas.

Provincial expressways with incorrect use of NTHS codes 
 "G1201" Jilin Ring Expressway (吉林绕城高速) - real G12, G1211 and G1212
 "G1202" Songyuan Ring Expressway (松原绕城高速) - real G12, G45 and G1015
 "G3022" Weinan Transit Expressway (渭南过境高速) - no real number
 "G3023" Xixing Expressway (西兴高速) - no real number
 "G3024" Baoji Transit Expressway (宝鸡过境高速)  - no real number

Former 
 "G0501" S2202 Linfen Ring Expressway (临汾绕城高速) 
 "G1204" S17 Baicheng Ring Expressway (白城绕城高速)
 "G1502" Quanzhou Ring Expressway (泉州绕城高速) real S11, S56, and S58; removed in 2022
 "G15E" S15 Shenhai Expressway Zini Expressway (沈海高速 紫泥高速)
 "G1801" S5901 Shuozhou Ring Expressway (朔州绕城高速)
 "G2002" S2003 Yangquan Ring Expressway (阳泉绕城高速)
 "G2201" S2201 Changzhi Ring Expressway (长治绕城高速)
 "G4202" SA2 Chengdu 2nd Ring Expressway (成都第二绕城高速)
 "G4203" SA3 G9910 Chengdu Metropolitan Area Ring Expressway (成都都市圈环线高速)
 "G47" S47 Nenjiang-Dandong Expressway (嫩丹高速公路) part of G4512 Shuangliao-Nenjiang Expressway
 "G5501" S5501 Datong Ring Expressway（大同绕城高速）
 "G76S1" S76 Dongxiao Expressway (东肖高速公路)

See also
 Expressways of China
 List of primary NTHS Expressways

Notes
1.This was during the time before 71118, when the sequence of beltways in Chengdu in the NTHS system from inner to outermost was G4201 - G4202 - G4203. Of these, only G4201 was ever a legitimate NTHS expressway. But after G4201 changed its number to G4202 as part of 71118, the former G4202 (described here) and G4203 were demoted to provincial S routes named SA2 and SA3 respectively. As of late 2022, SA2 remains a provincial expressway, but SA3 has been superseded by G9910.

References

NTHS Expressways, aux
NTHS Expressways, aux